M&M's World (also M&M's or M&M's store) is a retail store that specializes in M&M's candy and merchandise. The first location was on the Las Vegas Strip in 1997, with others in Orlando, Florida, New York City, London, Henderson, Nevada, Shanghai, Bloomington, Minnesota and Berlin.

Locations

Las Vegas
The first location opened on the Las Vegas Strip in 1997, in the Showcase Mall next to the MGM Grand.<ref name=CSA>Will]], 1998-02-08, p. 7.</ref> The four-story M&M's World includes a gift shop on the first floor. The shop leads to a 3D movie theater that shows the short subject I Lost My M In Vegas. Also on display are M&M's in nearly every color, and a replica of the No. 18 M&M's race car that is driven in the NASCAR Monster Energy Cup Series by Kyle Busch. M&M's clothing is sold on the second floor and on the stairs that go up to the second floor are pictures showing how the M&M's characters have evolved over the years painted on the wall.

The Las Vegas location received eight million visitors in 2007.

Orlando
Located in The Florida Mall, the 17,500-square-foot Orlando store was named "international store of the year" for 2005 by the Institute of Store Planners and VM+SD'' magazine (which covers store design and visual merchandising).

In late 2019, Mars Retail Group announced that they would be moving its Florida Mall location to Disney Springs, with an opening set for 2020. The Florida Mall location closed on August 21, 2020 with the opening of the Disney Springs location scheduled for the end of 2020.

The Disney Springs location officially opened on January 30, 2021.

New York City

It includes a -wide, two-story-high, "wall of chocolate", made up of 72 continuous candy-filled tubes.

M&M's World in Times Square is New York City's largest candy store, and offers merchandise such as themed clothing, dishware, watches, and piggy banks. Before it opened on December 7, 2006, nearly 13,000 people lined up for the 198 jobs, which were in demand because of a more generous health benefit package than is usually offered for an entry-level retail job in New York.

London

On 13 June 2011, M&M's World shop in London opened to the public, in Leicester Square. The site was formerly occupied by the Swiss Centre.

It is the world's largest candy store, at 35,000 sq ft (3,250 sq metres). The retail space was built as part of Westminster City Council's regeneration of the local area, to create a "world class destination", based on the similar remodelling of Times Square New York.

Henderson
Mars Incorporated has a store close to its Ethel M Chocolate Factory in Henderson, Nevada. It is situated near to the plant's Ethel M Botanical Cactus Garden, which is one of the world's largest collections of its kind, and is based on the naturalistic English landscape garden model.

Shanghai

First opened on August 8, 2014, it is the only branch of M&M's World in Asia. The 1,600-square-meter store is located in the busy Shanghai Shimao International Plaza. The store re-opened in December 2018 after a remodel.

Mall of America
In 2020, it was announced that Mall of America in Bloomington, Minnesota would be the first M&M's retail store to open in the Midwest, and fourth location in the United States with others in Las Vegas, Orlando and New York City. The store officially opened to the public on May 1, 2021.

Berlin
The M&M's Store in Berlin opened on the Kurfürstendamm on October 2, 2021.

References

External links
|| M&M's World London Information
Official M&M'S World Site
Mars Retail Group expanding M&M’s store footprint — at home and abroad

Chocolate museums in the United States
Las Vegas Strip
Times Square
Tourist attractions in the Las Vegas Valley
Confectionery stores
M&M's
1997 establishments in Nevada